"Superman (It's Not Easy)" is a song written and performed by American singer Five for Fighting. It was released on April 16, 2001, as the second single from his second studio album America Town. Following the September 11 attacks, the song was used to honor the victims, survivors, police, and firefighters involved in the attacks.

The song debuted on the Billboard Hot 100 chart at number 38 on October 27, 2001, then subsequently peaked at number 14, becoming Five for Fighting's first top-40 hit in the United States. The single was a major hit in Australia and New Zealand, reaching number two on both countries' national charts. It additionally reached the top 20 in Ireland, Italy and Norway. It was nominated for a Grammy Award for Best Pop Performance by a Duo or Group with Vocals at the 44th Grammy Awards in 2002.

Content
The lyrics focus on the iconic hero Superman; specifically, how, in the opinion of the singer, his life as a hero is surprisingly difficult despite his immense power. Ondrasik said the song is about "frustration about the inability to be heard."

Music video
The music video was directed by Ramaa Mosley and premiered in June 2001. A scene from this video was filmed at Yonge Street and Richmond Street in Toronto, Ontario. At the end of the song's music video, John Ondrasik lies in bed with his own wife and son. Rob Thomas makes a cameo appearance in the video.

Impact

September 11 attacks
Ondrasik was in London during the September 11 attacks, preparing for a concert; the song was beginning to pick up steam in Europe. However, the song grew in popularity in the United States after the attacks, with CBS News writing that "...it became an anthem in the days after 9/11. Its lyrics resonated with people, bringing a sense of raw humanity and comfort to those who needed it most."

Charts

Weekly charts

Year-end charts

Certifications

Release history

In popular culture and covers
"Superman" has been covered multiple times by various artists. The song was covered by shadow musician Catman Cohen in 2005 via CD, How I Want to Live: the Catman Chronicles 2. In his 2010 comedy tour, Conan O'Brien sang a cover of the song by himself before Jim Carrey appeared in a Superman suit to sing a duet with O'Brien. Australian comedy rock trio the Axis of Awesome parodied this song with a new song, "Birdplane". This song turned out to affect the band, as it represented Jordan Raskopoulos and her transgender transition.

The song has also been used in multiple television programs. It was aptly featured in Smallville, a coming-of-age series focused on the adventures of teenage Clark Kent. A cover of the song by Briana Lee was used in the series finale of the television show Code Black.

In 2011, the song was used to honor the memory of hockey player and former Vancouver Canuck, Rick Rypien at Rogers Arena, Vancouver. Rypien committed suicide in the summer of 2011 after a lengthy battle with depression.

References

2000 songs
2000s ballads
2001 singles
APRA Award winners
Columbia Records singles
Five for Fighting songs
Pop ballads
Rock ballads
Songs about comics
Songs about fictional male characters
Songs written by John Ondrasik
Superman music